Kenneth Marshall Watson (born September 7, 1921) is a theoretical physicist and physical oceanographer.

Watson graduated in 1943 with BS in electrical engineering from Iowa State College. From 1943 to 1946 he was a researcher at the United States Naval Research Laboratory in Washington, D.C. During his work for the U.S. Navy he went to night school at George Washington University. He graduated from the University of Iowa with Ph.D. in 1948 with thesis The polarizability of the meson-charge cloud of a neutron in an external electrostatic field. He was from 1948 to 1949 an Atomic Energy Commission (AEC) Fellow at the Institute for Advanced Study and from 1949 to 1951 an AEC Fellow at the Berkeley Radiation Laboratory. He was from 1951 to 1954 an assistant professor of physics at Indiana University and from 1954 to 1957 an associate professor of physics at the University of Wisconsin, Madison. In 1953 he was elected a fellow of the American Physical Society. From 1957 to 1981 he was a staff member of Lawrence Berkeley National Laboratory, as well as a professor of physics at the University of California, Berkeley. In 1974 he was elected a member of the National Academy of Sciences. From 1981 to 1991 he was the director of the Marine Physical Laboratory, Scripps Institute of Oceanography, as well as a professor of physical oceanography at the University of California, San Diego. In 1991 he retired as professor emeritus. His doctoral students include Shang-keng Ma.

Watson was an advisor to various United States organizations associated with the United States Department of Defense. In 1959 he worked with Marvin L. Goldberger, Keith Brueckner, and Murray Gell-Mann to join John A. Wheeler, Charles H. Townes, and others in forming the JASON group of government advisors. Watson remained in JASON until 1998. In 1971 he, with four others, formed the company Physical Dynamics, Inc. and then remained on the board of directors until 1981.

He did research in the early 1950s on nuclear and pi meson physics, as well as quantum mechanical collision processes, and in the late 1950s on plasma physics
and controlled nuclear fusion.

To quote Watson:

Watson did research in the early 1970s on atomic and molecular scattering and in the late 1970s on fluid mechanics related to oceanography. He worked in the early 1980s on applying methods of statistical mechanics to internal wave turbulence and in the early 1990s on analyzing the coupling of surface and internal gravity waves. 

To quote Watson:

He married in 1946 and is the father of two sons. His father was Louis Erwin Watson (1884–1957) and his mother was Irene Marshall Watson (born 1886 in Roanoke, Illinois).

Selected publications
with M. L. Goldberger:  2004 Dover reprint of corrected 2nd edition,  Robert E. Krieger Publishing Company, 1975
with John W. Bond and Jasper A. Welch: 
with John Nuttall and John Stephen Roy Chisholm: 
with Roger F. Dashen, Walter H. Munk, and Fredrik Zachariasen:  2010 pbk reprint

References

20th-century American physicists
American oceanographers
American centenarians
Men centenarians
Iowa State University alumni
University of Iowa alumni
University of California, Berkeley faculty
Scripps Institution of Oceanography faculty
Fellows of the American Physical Society
Members of JASON (advisory group)
Members of the United States National Academy of Sciences
1921 births
Living people
Writers from Des Moines, Iowa
Scientists from Iowa
United States Navy personnel of World War II